XHCAO-FM (89.1 MHz) is a radio station in Ciudad Camargo, Tamaulipas, Mexico, serving Reynosa, Tamaulipas and McAllen, Texas.

History
XHCAO began on 101.7 FM, with a concession awarded to Liza Garza Acosta on August 16, 1994. In 2000, it was sold to Radio BMP de Ciudad Camargo, around the same time it moved to 89.1 FM.

In April 2019, R Communications sold XHCAO, XHAVO and XHRR to Radio Ultra, S.A. de C.V. The concession transfer is pending IFT approval.

External links

 raiostationworld.com; Radio stations serving the Rio Grande Valley

References

Regional Mexican radio stations
Radio stations in Reynosa
Radio stations established in 1994
1994 establishments in Mexico